Cuzmin (Kuzmin) is a commune in the Camenca sub-district of Transnistria, Moldova. It is composed of two villages, Cuzmin and Voitovca (Війтівка, Войтовка). It has since 1990 been administered as a part of the breakaway Pridnestrovian Moldavian Republic (PMR).

References

Communes of Transnistria
Camenca District